is a retired male medley swimmer from Japan. He represented his native country at the 2004 Summer Olympics in Athens, Greece. He is best known for winning three gold medals at the Summer Universiade.

References
 sports-reference

1980 births
Living people
Japanese male medley swimmers
Olympic swimmers of Japan
Swimmers at the 2004 Summer Olympics
Sportspeople from Kumamoto Prefecture
Asian Games medalists in swimming
Swimmers at the 1998 Asian Games
Swimmers at the 2002 Asian Games
Asian Games gold medalists for Japan
Asian Games silver medalists for Japan
Universiade medalists in swimming
Medalists at the 1998 Asian Games
Medalists at the 2002 Asian Games
Universiade gold medalists for Japan
Universiade bronze medalists for Japan
Medalists at the 1999 Summer Universiade
Medalists at the 2001 Summer Universiade
Medalists at the 2003 Summer Universiade
21st-century Japanese people